Tecumseh High School can refer to:

Tecumseh High School (Indiana) in Lynnville, Indiana
Tecumseh High School (Michigan) in Tecumseh, Michigan
Tecumseh High School (Franklin Furnace, Ohio) 
Tecumseh High School (New Carlisle, Ohio) 
Tecumseh High School (Oklahoma) in Tecumseh, Oklahoma